The 2nd Madhesh Provincial Assembly was elected through the provincial elections held on 20 November 2022. The assembly has 64 constituency seats in which members are elected through direct elections and 43 proportional representation party list seats. The term of the assembly is 5 years unless dissolved earlier. The first session of the assembly started from 2 January 2023.

Leaders

Officers 

 Speaker of the Assembly: Hon. Ram Chandra Mandal (CPN (UML))
 Deputy Speaker of the Assembly: Hon. Babita Devi Raut Ishar (Janamat Party)
 Leader of the House (Chief Minister): Hon. Saroj Kumar Yadav
 Leader of the Opposition: Hon. Krishna Prasad Yadav

Parliamentary party 

 Parliamentary party leader of CPN (UML): Hon. Saroj Kumar Yadav
 Parliamentary party leader of Nepali Congress: Hon. Krishna Prasad Yadav
 Parliamentary party leader of People's Socialist Party: Hon. Saroj Yadav
 Parliamentary party leader of Janamat Party: Hon. Mahesh Prasad Yadav
 Parliamentary party leader of Loktantrik Samajwadi Party, Nepal: Hon. Abhiram Sharma
 Parliamentary party leader of CPN (Maoist Centre): Hon. Bharat Prasad Sah
 Parliamentary party leader of CPN (Unified Socialist): Hon. Govinda Bahadur Neupane

Whips 

 Chief Whip of Janamat Party: Hon. Chandan Kumar Singh

Composition

Members

Defections

References

External links 

 समानुपातिक निर्वाचन प्रणाली तर्फको मधेश प्रदेश सभामा निर्वाचित सदस्यहरुको विवरण

Members of the Provincial Assembly of Madhesh Province